William Richardson was a British colonial governor. He was Deputy Governor of Anguilla from 1805 until 1829.

References

Deputy Governors of Anguilla
1829 deaths
Year of birth unknown